Salvador Manzur Díaz (born 5 April 1976) is a Mexican politician from the Institutional Revolutionary Party. From 2009 to 2010 he served as Deputy of the LXI Legislature of the Mexican Congress representing Veracruz.

References

1976 births
Living people
Politicians from Veracruz
People from Veracruz (city)
Institutional Revolutionary Party politicians
21st-century Mexican politicians
Deputies of the LXI Legislature of Mexico
Members of the Chamber of Deputies (Mexico) for Veracruz